Mariano Arrate Esnaola (12 August 1892 – 24 December 1963) was a Spanish football (soccer) player who competed in the 1920 Summer Olympics. He was born and died in San Sebastián. He was a member of the Spanish team, which won the silver medal in the football tournament.

He played for Luchana (1908–1909), San Sebastián (Real Sociedad B) (1909–1911) and Real Sociedad (1911–1924).

Notes

References

External links
 

1892 births
1963 deaths
Spanish footballers
Spain international footballers
Footballers at the 1920 Summer Olympics
Olympic footballers of Spain
Olympic silver medalists for Spain
Real Sociedad footballers
Footballers from San Sebastián
Olympic medalists in football
Medalists at the 1920 Summer Olympics
Association football defenders
Basque Country international footballers